Prairie Dog State Park is a state park located 4 miles west of Norton, Kansas, United States on Highway 261. Located in western Kansas, the Prairie Dog State Park is named after the creek that feeds into the Keith Sebelius reservoir, and had no prairie dog populations living there when it was established in 1967. Prairie dogs were introduced in the 1980s and the state park now holds a thriving colony of about 300.

Prairie Dog State Park is a  park that is located on the north shore of Keith Sebelius Lake in Norton County. The dam was completed for Keith Sebelius Reservoir in 1965 and quickly filled up the following year.  One of the last remaining adobe house is located at the Prairie Dog State Park. The renovated house was built sometime in the 1890s.  Also located in Prairire Dog State Park is the 1886 Hillmon one room school house.

Prairie Dog State Park has many recreation opportunities for campers to enjoy including a 1.4 mile nature trail, viewable prairie dog town, sand volleyball pit, disc golf course, regulation size basketball court, archery range, horse shoe pits, playground, swimbeach, fishing dock, 1886 one room school house, adobe home, and a 30'x70' Lake View shelter.

References

External links

State parks of Kansas
Protected areas of Norton County, Kansas